Joseph Lyle Menendez (born January 10, 1968) and Erik Galen Menendez (born November 27, 1970) are American brothers who were convicted in 1996 for the murders of their parents, José and Mary Louise Menéndez.

During the trial, the Menéndez brothers stated that they committed the murders in fear that their father would kill them after they threatened to expose him for years of sexual, emotional, and physical abuse, while the prosecution argued that they did it to inherit their father's multimillion-dollar estate. They were first tried separately, with one jury for each brother. Both juries deadlocked, which resulted in a mistrial. For the second trial, they were tried together by a single jury, which found them guilty, and as a result, they were sentenced to life imprisonment without the possibility of parole.

Background
Lyle and Erik's father, José Enrique Menéndez, was born on May 6, 1944, in Havana, Cuba. At age 16, shortly after the start of the Cuban Revolution, he moved to the United States. José attended Southern Illinois University, where he met Mary Louise "Kitty" Andersen (1941–1989). They married in 1963 and moved to New York City, where José earned an accounting degree from Queens College.

The couple's first son, Joseph Lyle Menéndez, who goes by his middle name, was born on January 10, 1968, in New York. Kitty quit her teaching job after Lyle was born, and the family moved to New Jersey, where Erik was born on November 27, 1970, in Gloucester Township. In New Jersey, the family lived in Hopewell Township and both brothers attended Princeton Day School.

In the summer of 1976, Lyle and Erik's cousin Diane Vander Molen came to stay with them. She claims Lyle confessed to her that he was being sexually abused by his father. Vander Molen told his mother Kitty what he had said but she took her husband's side and said he was lying. Vander Molen recalls that afterward Kitty put Lyle upstairs and that was the last Vander Molen heard anything about it.

In 1986, José's career as a corporate executive (he had recently joined the company then known as International Video Entertainment) took the family to Beverly Hills, California. The following year, Erik began attending Beverly Hills High School, where he earned average grades and displayed a remarkable talent for tennis, ranking 44th in the US for 18-and-under players. Lyle attended Princeton University, but was on academic probation for poor grades, and was eventually suspended for plagiarism.

Crimes 
On the evening of August 20, 1989, José and Kitty were standing in the den of their Beverly Hills mansion when Lyle and Erik entered the den carrying shotguns. José was shot 6 times, including the fatal shot in the back of the head with a Mossberg 12-gauge shotgun. Kitty was shot 10 times in total. Before the fatal shot to her cheek, she was on the ground, slowly crawling and moaning. Lyle then ran to his car to reload, and then fired the fatal shot to her face.

Immediately after the killings, both brothers remained in the house, expecting the police to respond due to the noise of the gunshots. When the police did not arrive, the brothers picked up the shotgun shells from the ground and left the house to dispose the guns and build an alibi. The brothers returned to the house later that night and Lyle called the police, shouting, "Someone killed my parents!" When the police arrived, the brothers told them that the killings had occurred while they were out at a movie theater seeing Batman and attending the "Taste of L.A." festival at the Santa Monica Civic Auditorium. However, the police did not seek gunshot residue tests from the brothers, which would have indicated whether they had recently discharged a firearm.

In the months after the killings, the brothers began to spend extravagantly on luxury items, businesses, and travel. Lyle bought a Chuck's Spring Street Cafe, a Buffalo wing restaurant in Princeton, New Jersey, as well as a Rolex watch and a Porsche Carrera. Erik hired a full-time tennis coach and competed in a series of tournaments in Israel. The brothers eventually left the Beverly Hills mansion unoccupied, choosing to live in adjoining condominiums in nearby Marina del Rey. They also dined expensively, and went on overseas trips to the Caribbean and London. They collectively spent approximately $700,000 before their arrests; family members later disputed a connection between their spending and the murder of their parents, claiming that there were no changes in their spending habits after the killings.

During the early stages of the investigation, the police tried to narrow their search to suspects who had motives to kill José and Kitty, and also investigated potential mob leads. As their investigation continued, they began to suspect that the brothers were the most likely perpetrators because of the obvious financial motive and their exorbitant spending after the killings. In an attempt to get a confession from Erik, the police arranged for his friend Craig Cignarelli to wear a wire during a lunch with Erik at a local beachfront restaurant, but when Cignarelli asked Erik whether he had killed his parents, Erik denied it. Erik eventually confessed to his psychologist Jerome Oziel, who then told his mistress, Judalon Smyth. Smyth later broke up with Oziel and told the police about the brothers' involvement. Lyle was arrested on March 8, 1990, and Erik turned himself in three days later after returning to Los Angeles from Israel. Both were held without bail and kept separate from each other.

In August 1990, Judge James Albrecht ruled that tapes of the conversations between Erik and Oziel were admissible evidence since Oziel stated that Lyle allegedly threatened him and violated doctor–patient privilege. Albrecht's ruling was appealed, after which the proceedings were delayed for two years. The Supreme Court of California ruled in August 1992 that most of the tapes were admissible with the exception of the tape on which Erik was recorded discussing the murders. After that decision, a Los Angeles County grand jury issued indictments in December 1992, charging the brothers with the murders of their parents.

Trials
The Menéndez case became a national sensation when Court TV broadcast the trial in 1993. Represented by their defense lawyer, Leslie Abramson, the brothers stated that they killed their parents out of fear for their lives after a lifetime of abuse at the hands of their parents, especially sexual abuse at the hands of their father, who was described as a cruel perfectionist and pedophile. Meanwhile, their mother was described as an enabling, selfish, mentally unstable alcoholic and drug addict who encouraged her husband's behavior and was also violent towards the brothers.

The allegations against the couple were supported by two family members during their testimonies. The brothers' cousin, Andy Cano, said that as a child, he was told by Erik about the sexual abuse, which they both described as "penis massages." Diane Vander Molen, another cousin of the brothers, stated that she once told Kitty about José's molestation of Lyle, although Kitty told her that it was false.

A photograph was presented as physical evidence by the defense, showing Lyle and Erik's genitalia allegedly taken by their father when they were children. The prosecution argued, however, that the killings were done for financial gain. The financial gain theory was disputed by the defense team claiming that the brothers did not think they were getting any inheritance. Lyle's prosecutor, Pam Bozanich, argued that "men could not be raped because they lack the necessary equipment to be raped."

Erik testified that a couple weeks before the night of the killings, that he told his brother about the sexual abuse he was experiencing, which then led to several confrontations within the family. They also testified that their father threatened to kill them if they did not keep the abuse a secret. They claimed that the last confrontation happened inside the house den on August 20, 1989, a few minutes before Kitty and José were killed. The brothers then stated that their father closed the den's door at that time, which was unusual. Paranoid and afraid that they would be killed by their own parents, Lyle and Erik went outside of the house to load their shotguns. Erik stated, "As I went into the room, I just started firing."

The trial ended with two deadlocked juries, and as a result, Los Angeles County District Attorney Gil Garcetti announced immediately that the brothers would be retried. The second trial was somewhat less publicized, in part because Judge Stanley Weisberg did not allow cameras in the courtroom. During the second trial, Weisberg, upholding a legal decision by the Supreme Court in an unrelated case, limited testimony about the sexual abuse claims and did not allow the jury to vote on manslaughter charges instead of murder charges.

Both brothers were eventually convicted on two counts of first-degree murder and conspiracy to commit murder; in the penalty phase of the trial, they were sentenced to life in prison without the possibility of parole. The jury said that the abuse defense was not a factor in its deliberations, but decided not to impose the death penalty because both brothers had no criminal record or history of violence prior to the murders. However, unlike the juries in the previous trials, the jury in the penalty phase rejected the defense's theory that the brothers killed their parents out of fear and believed that they committed the killings in order to inherit their father's wealth.

During the penalty phase of the trial, Abramson (the brothers' defense lawyer), apparently told a defense witness named William Vicary to edit his own notes, but the district attorney's office decided not to launch a criminal investigation on Abramson. Both brothers also filed motions for a mistrial, claiming that they suffered irreversible damage in the penalty phase as a result of possible misconduct and ineffective representation by Abramson. On July 2, 1996, Weisberg sentenced the brothers to life in prison without the possibility of parole, and also sentenced them to consecutive sentences for the killings and the charges of conspiracy to commit murder.

Incarceration
As in their pretrial detention, the California Department of Corrections separated the brothers and sent them to different prisons. Since they were considered to be maximum-security inmates, they were segregated from other prisoners. They remained in separate prisons until February 2018, when Lyle was moved from Mule Creek State Prison in northern California to the Richard J. Donovan Correctional Facility in San Diego County; where they were housed in separate units. Erik also spent some time at Pleasant Valley Prison in Coalinga, California.

On April 4, 2018, Lyle was moved into the same housing unit as Erik, reuniting them for the first time since they began serving their sentences nearly 22 years earlier. The brothers burst into tears and hugged each other at their first meeting in the housing unit. The unit where they are housed is reserved for inmates who agree to participate in education and rehabilitation programs without creating disruptions.

Appeals
On February 27, 1998, the California Court of Appeal upheld the brothers' murder convictions, and on May 28, 1998, the Supreme Court of California declined to review the case, thus allowing the decision of the appellate court to stand. Both brothers filed habeas corpus petitions with the Supreme Court of California, which were denied in 1999. Having exhausted their appeal remedies in state court, they filed separate habeas corpus petitions in the United States District Court. On March 4, 2003, a magistrate judge recommended the denial of the petitions, and the district court adopted the recommendation. They then decided to appeal to the United States Court of Appeals for the Ninth Circuit. On September 7, 2005, a three-judge panel denied both their habeas corpus petitions, although Judge Alex Kozinski stated that the trial judge changed many of his rulings during the two trials.

Marriages and interviews in prison
On July 2, 1996, Lyle married Anna Eriksson at a ceremony attended by Abramson and his aunt Marta Menéndez, and presided over by Judge Nancy Brown; they divorced on April 1, 2001 after Eriksson discovered that Lyle was allegedly cheating on her with another woman. In November 2003, Lyle married Rebecca Sneed at a ceremony in a visiting area of Mule Creek State Prison; they had known each other for around ten years before their engagement.

On June 12, 1999, Erik married Tammi Ruth Saccoman at Folsom State Prison in a prison waiting room. Tammi later stated: "Our wedding cake was a Twinkie. We improvised. It was a wonderful ceremony until I had to leave. That was a very lonely night." In an October 2005 interview with ABC News, she described her relationship with Erik as "something that I've dreamed about for a long time. And it's just something very special that I never thought that I would ever have."

In 2005, Tammi self-published a book, They Said We'd Never Make It – My Life with Erik Menéndez, but she said on CNN's Larry King Live that Erik also "did a lot of editing on the book." In an interview with People magazine, she stated:

Tammi also stated that she and her daughter drive the  every weekend to visit Erik, and that her daughter refers to him as her "Earth Dad". Despite his life sentence, Erik stated: "Tammi is what gets me through. I can't think about the sentence. When I do, I do it with a great sadness and a primal fear. I break into a cold sweat. It's so frightening I just haven't come to terms with it."

In 2010, A&E released Mrs. Menéndez, a documentary about Tammi. In late 2017, A&E aired a five-part documentary titled The Menendez Murders: Erik Tells All, in which Erik describes via telephone the murders and the aftermath. The series also shows never-before-seen photos and new interviews with prosecutors, law enforcement, close family and friends, and medical experts.

In popular culture

Documentaries
 In 2000, "Menendez Brothers – Blood Brothers", an episode from the documentary series by Court TV (now TruTV) Mugshots, was aired at FilmRise.
 In 2015, Barbara Walters Presents: American Scandals featured the Menendez brothers in an episode, "Menendez Brothers: The Bad Sons".
 In 2016, the Menendez brothers were featured in the true-crime documentary Snapped.
 In 2017, the Menendez brothers were featured in a documentary, Truth and Lies: The Menéndez Brothers – American Sons, American Murderers on ABC.
 In 2017, HLN launched the new series How it Really Happened – with Hill Harper, with an episode featuring the Menendez brothers story. The episode, "The Menéndez Brothers: Murder in Beverly Hills", ends with a telephone interview of Lyle from jail with Chris Cuomo.
 In 2020, BuzzFeed Unsolved features the Menendez brothers in a one-episode special, "How They Were Caught: The Menendez Brothers".
 In 2021, the Menendez brothers were the subject of ABC's 20/20 special, Inside the Menendez Movement. The special features the popularity of the brothers in the video-sharing social media app TikTok, and their growing number of supporters from young adults outside and inside of the United States.

Films and series

Films 

 In 1994, the Menendez brothers were featured in the television film Menendez: A Killing in Beverly Hills on CBS. Lyle was portrayed by Damian Chapa, and Erik was portrayed by Travis Fine.
 In 1994, the television film Honor thy Father and Mother: The True Story of the Menendez Murders features Lyle and Erik Menendez portrayed by Billy Warlock and David Berón, respectively.
 In 1994, the Menendez brothers were loosely depicted in the crime film Natural Born Killers.
 In 2017, the Menendez brothers were featured in the Lifetime television film Menendez: Blood Brothers (2017). Lyle was portrayed by Nico Tortorella, and Erik was portrayed by Myko Olivier.

Television series 

 In 1990, the Law & Order Season 1 episode "The Serpent's Tooth" is loosely based on the Menendez Brothers case.
 In 2008, "Gavin Volure", a season 3 episode of the TV series 30 Rock, features Tracy Jordan making multiple references to the Menendez brothers as he fears that his own children will similarly attempt to kill him for his wealth, an act he termed as "Menendez-ing".
 In 2010, the Menendez brothers were referenced by Bobby Singer in season 6, episode 12 of the CW series Supernatural.
 In 2016, the Menendez brothers were mentioned several times in the FX drama The People v. O. J. Simpson: American Crime Story (2016). Based on the true story of O. J. Simpson's highly televised trial, the series was set at the same time as the Menendez brothers' trials. There are several characters who have worked in the brothers' and O. J. Simpson's respective cases, such as Robert Shapiro, Lance Ito, and Gil Garcetti. Shapiro (portrayed by John Travolta) mentioned Erik in Episode 2 stating, "In fact, I arranged the surrender of Erik Menendez from Israel." This statement is based on the actual speech by Shapiro during Simpson's infamous Bronco chase, in an attempt to have him surrender to the police.
 In 2017, NBC aired Law & Order: True Crime – The Menéndez Murders. An 8-episode special from the Law & Order franchise, the series depicts the detailed killings, investigation, arrests, and trials of the Menendez brothers. Compared to its predecessors, the series portrays the brothers more sympathetically, focusing on the defense led by lawyer Leslie Abramson, and the physical and sexual abuse allegations. Lyle was portrayed by actor Miles Gaston Villanueva, who received a Best Actor nomination at the 33rd Imagen Awards, while Erik was portrayed by actor and singer Gus Halper. Its premiere at the Paley Center for Media was attended by Lyle's family and friends, who praised the series' depiction of the brothers. In an interview with Megyn Kelly Today after the first episode premiere, Lyle revealed that the series was "painful to watch", but the depiction of him by Villanueva is "surprisingly accurate" despite the producers and the actor not being able to communicate with him. At the 2018 Primetime Emmy Award, the series made its entry with a nomination for Outstanding Lead Actress in a Limited Series, with Edie Falco nominated for her portrayal of Abramson.
In Netflix’s 2023 Series That 90s Show, Red made a reference to the Menendez brothers while talking to his wife Kitty, coincidentally “Kitty” was also the nickname of their mother.

Parody and dark comedy
 In 1993, Saturday Night Live aired a comedy sketch featuring guest host John Malkovich where the Menendez brothers blame the murder of their parents on their identical twin brothers. In 2015, the Menendez brothers are referenced again in the sketch song "First Got Horny 2 U" from a Season 41 episode hosted by Elizabeth Banks.
 In 1996, the media hype surrounding the first trial was parodied in the dark comedy film The Cable Guy.
 In 2009, the TV Show The Venture Bros. featured two former boy detectives named Lance and Dale Hale who are heavily implied to have killed their father with a shotgun.
 In 2010, the TV Show 30 Rock S06E16 featured a brief joke where a character has a tattoo with the text "Free Lyle Menendez".
 In 2016, the Menendez brothers were subjects of the weekly comedic 'true-crime' podcast The Last Podcast on the Left.

Others 

 The Menendez brothers are seen in the background of the 1990–1991 NBA Hoops' Mark Jackson basketball card in which the New York Knicks point guard is seen making a bounce pass and they appear to be sitting courtside behind Jackson. In December 2018, eBay began terminating any auctions in which they are mentioned in the listing. The New York Knicks played 28 games during the period when the Menendez brothers went on a spending spree after the murders of their parents. Some eBay sellers have continued to sell the card and have also altered the images accompanying the listing so that the Menendez brothers are neither mentioned in the listing nor seen in photos of the card accompanying the listing.

See also 
 List of homicides in California
 Parricide
 Stacey Lannert

References

Further reading
 Davis, Don (1994) Bad Blood: The Shocking True Story Behind the Menéndez Killings St. Martin, New York, 
 Menéndez, Lyle; Novelli, Norma; Walker, Mike; and Spreckels, Judith (1995) The Private Diary of Lyle Menéndez: In His Own Words! Dove Books, Beverly Hills, California, 
 Menéndez, Tammi (2005) They Said We'd Never Make It: My Life With Erik Menéndez NewGalen Publishing, Santa Clarita, California, 
 Soble, Ronald L. and Johnson, John (1994) Blood Brothers: The Inside Story of the Menéndez Murders Onyx, New York, 
 Thornton, Hazel; Wrightsman, Lawrence S.; Posey, Amy J. and Scheflin, Alan W. (1995) Hung Jury: The Diary of a Menéndez Juror Temple University Press, Philadelphia; new "20 Years Later" edition updated with new material, Graymalkin Media (2017) 
 Rand, Robert (2018) The Menendez Murders: The Shocking Untold Story of the Menendez Family and the Killings that Stunned the Nation BenBella Books

External links
 Nightmare on Elm Drive by Dominick Dunne. Vanity Fair, October 1990
 Three Faces of Evil by Dominick Dunne. Vanity Fair, June 1996
 Wife of Erik Menéndez talks about relationship at MSNBC TV, December 22, 2005
 Tammi Menéndez on Loving Erik at ABC News
 Menéndez Brothers at Court TV (now TruTV)
 Menéndez Brothers at Crime Library
 Mug shots of the brothers on The Smoking Gun
 archived trial transcripts from Court TV
 
 

1960s births
Living people
1989 murders in the United States
20th-century American criminals
American male criminals
American people convicted of murder
American prisoners and detainees
Crime in California
Criminal duos
Criminals from California
Male murderers
Parricides
People convicted of murder by California
Prisoners and detainees of California
Sibling duos